Tesfay Abraha Habtemariam (born 3 October 1990 in Asmara) is an Eritrean former cyclist.

Major results
2010
 10th Overall Tour of Eritrea
1st Stage 5
2011
 2nd African Road Race Championships
 2nd Overall Tour of Eritrea
2012
 7th Overall Tour of Eritrea
2013
 1st Overall Fenkel Northern Redsea
 1st Stage 2 Tour of Eritrea

References

1990 births
Living people
Eritrean male cyclists
Sportspeople from Asmara